Carol-Ann Warner (born 13 July 1945) is a British figure skater. She competed in the ladies' singles event at the 1964 Winter Olympics.

References

External links
 

1945 births
Living people
British female single skaters
Olympic figure skaters of Great Britain
Figure skaters at the 1964 Winter Olympics
Sportspeople from London